Manzanita Peak is a mountain in the eastern part of Mitkof Island, one of the islands in the Alexander Archipelago in Alaska. It is to the west of Favor Peak and northwest of Sam Peak.

References

Mountains of Alaska
Mitkof Island
Mountains of Petersburg Borough, Alaska
Alexander Archipelago